Knockout may refer to one of two British comics. The original series, published by the Amalgamated Press (later Fleetway Publications), started on 4 March 1939 and ended on 16 February 1963, when it merged with Valiant. The second series, published by IPC Magazines, ran from 12 June 1971 to 23 June 1973, when it merged with Whizzer and Chips.

First series
The first series, titled Knockout Comics, was launched by editor Percy Clarke and sub-editor Leonard Matthews in 1939 to compete with The Dandy and The Beano (launched by DC Thomson in 1937 and 1938 respectively). Like its rivals, it featured a mixture of humour and adventure strips and illustrated prose stories. Matthews recruited Hugh McNeill, a former Beano artist, as the title's main humour artist, and his strips Our Ernie and Deed-a-Day Danny were very popular. Two characters were imported from the prose story papers — Billy Bunter, formerly of The Magnet, initially drawn by C. H. Chapman, later by Frank Minnitt, and Sexton Blake, initially drawn by Jos Walker, later by Alfred Taylor, Roland Davies and definitive Blake illustrator Eric Parker. After the Second World War the title featured more adventure strips, and Matthews, who was promoted to editor in 1948, recruited artists including Sep E. Scott, H. M. Brock, D. C. Eyles and Geoff Campion to draw them.

The title lasted 1251 issues, from (cover dates) 4 March 1939 to 16 February 1963, absorbing The Magnet in 1940 (becoming Knockout and Magnet until 1945) and Comic Cuts in 1953, before being merged into Valiant (which became Valiant and Knockout for 53 issues from 23 February 1963 to 22 February 1964).

Knockout also published 16 "Fun Books" from 1941 to 1955, and 6 annuals from 1956 to 1961.

Other strips included:
 Battler Britton (1960–61, formerly featured in Sun; drawn by Geoff Campion)
 Buffalo Bill (1940)
 Davy Crockett (1955–60)
 Hopalong Cassidy (1954–60)
 Johnnie Wingco (1954–60)
 Kelly's Eye (1962–63, stories by Tom Tully and Tom Kerr, drawn by Francisco Solano López) 
 Robin Hood (1947, drawn by D. C. Eyles)
 Space Family Rollinson (1953–58; see French Wikipedia article)
 Stonehenge Kit the Ancient Brit (1939–50, drawn by Norman Ward)
 Thunderbolt Jaxon (1958-60)

Second series

The second series ran 106 issues from (issues dates) 12 June 1971 to 23 June 1973, when it merged with Whizzer and Chips. Its strips included:

 Beat Your Neighbour
 Boney
 Booter
 Dead Eye Dick
 Fuss Pot
 Joker
 Pete's Pockets
 Sammy Shrink (originated in Wham!, moved to Pow!, then Knockout) — about a boy who is only two inches tall; by Dave Jenner
 Stinker
 The Group
 The Haunted Wood
 The Super Seven
 The Toffs and the Toughs
 Thunderball
 Wanda Wheels
 Whistler
 Windy

References

Sources

External links
 Greyfriars Index - Publications of the Month includes a downloadable pdf of issue 723 of the original series (1953)
 A blog about the 1970s series

Comics magazines published in the United Kingdom
British humour comics
Fleetway and IPC Comics titles
Defunct British comics
1939 comics debuts
1963 comics endings
Magazines established in 1939
Magazines disestablished in 1963
1971 comics debuts
1973 comics endings
Magazines established in 1971
Magazines disestablished in 1973
Publications of Sexton Blake